Louisa Anne Beresford, Marchioness of Waterford (née Stuart; 14 April 1818 – 12 May 1891) was a Pre-Raphaelite watercolourist and philanthropist.

Biography
Born in Paris, she was the daughter of Charles Stuart, 1st Baron Stuart de Rothesay and the former Lady Elizabeth Margaret Yorke. Louisa's elder sister was Charlotte Canning, Countess Canning.

The family home was at Highcliffe Castle in Dorset, and had been in Stuart possession since about 1770 when Louisa's great-grandfather, John Stuart, 3rd Earl of Bute (a founder of Kew Gardens), while out botanising, discovered the cliff-top viewsite overlooking Christchurch Bay, and commissioned the architect Robert Adam, to design High Cliff, a sumptuous Georgian mansion, with grounds laid out by Capability Brown.

His fourth son, Lieutenant-General Sir Charles Stuart, inherited High Cliff, but landslips virtually destroyed the house, and he sold the greater part of the estate. Years later Louisa's father, who had had a long and distinguished career, been honoured with a knighthood, and raised to the peerage by George IV in 1828, bought back the land and between 1831 and 1835 built the house that became known as Highcliffe Castle, and which has been described as "the most important remaining example of the Romantic Picturesque style of architecture."

Charles Stuart made use of the architect William Donthorne, a founder member of the Royal Institute of British Architects, to design Highcliffe Castle. Incorporated in the design was carved medieval stonework from the Norman Benedictine Abbey of St Peter at Jumièges and from the Grande Maison des Les Andelys, both of which structures had fallen into disrepair after the French Revolution. Also included in the structure were a 16th-century oriel window and stained glass window.

Her father was appointed British Ambassador at Paris shortly before marrying Elizabeth Margaret Yorke on 6 February 1816. Louisa's childhood in Paris was marked by the early tuition she received in the arts, in keeping with being a great-granddaughter of the writer Lady Mary Wortley Montagu. Art, religion, and philanthropy would feature prominently in her life. Despite being an accomplished amateur artist, her paintings did not appear in galleries until the 1870s. Showing great concern for the welfare of her tenants on her Northumberland property, she redesigned the village of Ford, designed and built a school, and founded a temperance society. Over a period of 22 years between 1860 and 1882, she decorated the school hall with life-sized watercolours on paper, which had been applied to canvas and mounted on the interior walls and gables. The images portrayed biblical scenes, and used the village residents as models. The village school was in use until 1957, but is now known as the Waterford Gallery or Lady Waterford Hall.

Gleeson White described her talent in his work Children's Books and Their Illustrators

Louisa was tutored by Dante Gabriel Rossetti and attended drawing classes held by John Ruskin, together with Lady Trevelyan and Kate Greenaway, and had introduced Rose La Touche to him. It is believed that she modelled for Sir John Everett Millais in several of his works, and her beauty has been accredited as one of the inspirations of the Pre-Raphaelite Brotherhood.

On 8 June 1842 she married Henry Beresford, 3rd Marquess of Waterford, and settled in Curraghmore House in County Waterford, until he died in a horse riding accident in 1859. The marriage produced no children.

The erosion losses at Highcliffe were considerable and had been reckoned at about a yard a year – the coast path was in constant need of maintenance due to cliff falls. Louisa wrote in her Recollections to the age of 12 that part of the problem was landsliding in the clays and to combat this she introduced an extensive drainage system in the cliffs to keep the clays dry.
In about 1880 the problems of erosion of Highcliffe prompted her to seek an engineering solution. A prime cause was The Run, the river outflow from Christchurch Harbour, which because of its proximity to the cliffs, greatly increased the erosion. She arranged for the placing of limestone and granite-porphyry blocks near the Castle, with the idea of deflecting the course of The Run rather than directly opposing it. This groyne eventually disappeared and by 1931 only a few of the blocks were still visible at low tide.

In his 1893 work, the Victorian biographer, Augustus Hare (1834–1903), wrote The story of two noble lives : being memorials of Charlotte, Countess Canning, and Louisa, Marchioness of Waterford  – 

Her grave lies next to the Church of St Michael in Ford Village. Its stone was designed in 1891 by George Frederic Watts, and the slab by Watts's wife Mary Seton Watts. It is a Grade II Listed Building protected by law.

References

Sources
Lady Mary Wortley Montagu and Her Times – George Paston, books.google.co.za; accessed 11 May 2016.

Bibliography

Sublime & instructive; letters from John Ruskin to Louisa, Marchioness of Waterford, Anna Blunden and Ellen Heaton – Virginia Surtees (1972)
The story of two noble lives: being memorials of Charlotte, Countess Canning, and Louisa, Marchioness of Waterford – Augustus Hare (1893)
Neville, H.M. Under a Border tower: sketches and memories of Ford castle, Northumberland, and its surroundings, with a memoir of its late noble châtelaine, Louisa marchioness of Waterford; Newcastle upon Tyne, Mawson, Swan, & Morgan, 1896.
The Stuarts of Highcliffe – Robert Franklin

External links

 Ford and Etal, berwick.org.uk. Accessed 24 January 2023.

1818 births
1891 deaths
Louisa
Irish marchionesses
Daughters of barons
Wives of knights
English women painters
English watercolourists
Pre-Raphaelite painters
Louisa
Women of the Victorian era
19th-century British women artists
19th-century English painters
Women watercolorists
People from Ford, Northumberland
Female Pre-Raphaelite painters